= Yuliia Tatik =

Yuliia Tatik (born September 18, 1985, in Odesa) is a Ukrainian public figure, civic rights activist, lawyer, president of the "Advocates Union Ukrainian Association Of Lawyers", a polygraph expert, and a member of "The Ukrainian Polygraph Association".

== Biography ==
=== Education ===
In 2002, Tatik graduated from Secondary School No. 26 in Odesa with honors.

In 2007, she graduated from the Institute of Advocacy of the National University "Odesa Law Academy" with a master's degree in law with honors.

In 2016, she graduated from the Odesa National University of Economics, majoring in Finance and Credit, with a specialist degree.

=== Career ===
From September 2007 to July 2008, Yuliia Tatik was an assistant at the Department of Criminal Law, Trial and Forensic Science at the International Humanitarian University.

From February 2008 to November 2011, she worked as a lawyer at the private enterprise "ALEKKOM."

In March 2009, Yuliia Tatik received her certificate of right to practice law.

From August 2011 to December 2022, she held the position of director of the "Ukrainian Legal Company "Pravo'".

Since October 2016, she has been the president of the "Advocates Union Ukrainian Association Of Lawyers".

In 2017, Yuliya Tatik was invited by US senators and congressmen as part of the Ukrainian delegation to the 65th National Prayer Breakfast in Washington, attended by then-President Donald Trump.

From January 2018 to December 2022, she was a member of the supervisory board of the Kyiv Research and Design Institute "ENERGOPROEKT". From April 2021 to December 2022, Yuliia Tatik also chaired the supervisory board of this joint-stock company.

In October of the same year, she qualified as a polygraph expert and became a member of "The Ukrainian Polygraph Association".

Since October 2019, she has been a member of the supervisory board of PJSC "International Investment Group".

From September 2020 to April 26, 2021, she served as an advisor to the Vice Prime Minister of Ukraine – Minister of Strategic Industries of Ukraine voluntarily.

In 2020, Yuliya Tatik was recognized as the Lawyer of the Year by FaceNews.ua and the International Union of Lawyers and Experts in the Field of Combating Corruption.

Yuliya Tatik specializes in legal regulation in the field of preventing and countering corruption.

Since the beginning of Russia's full-scale invasion of Ukraine, she has been providing legal advice and assistance to military personnel, military spouses, and volunteers.
